This is a list of episodes from the tenth season of Hawaii Five-O.

Broadcast history
The season originally aired Thursdays at 9:00-10:00 pm (EST).

DVD release
The season was released on DVD by Paramount Home Video.

Episodes

References

10
1977 American television seasons
1978 American television seasons